The discography of American R&B singer-songwriter Raheem DeVaughn includes eight studio albums and 21 singles.

Albums

Studio albums

Collaboration albums

Singles

As lead artist

As featured artist

Guest appearances

Notes

References

External links
 

Discographies of American artists
Rhythm and blues discographies
Soul music discographies